The Sisters of the Holy Faith is a Catholic  religious congregation, originally for the care of Catholic orphans. It now works broadly in the areas of education and faith development. The congregation is part of the Vincentian family.

History
It was founded in Dublin, in 1857, by Margaret Aylward, under the direction of Rev. John Gowan, C.M., from the St. Peter's Vincentian Community in Phibsboro, Dublin.

The foundress was called a confessor of the Faith by Pope Pius IX, because of the imprisonment of six months she endured. She was convicted of contempt of court, but acquitted of a charge of kidnapping, after having refused to produce and return an abandoned child to its mother.

The congregation is especially active in the Archdiocese of Dublin, the residence of the superior general being at Glasnevin, where the sisters conducted a boarding-school for young ladies. The Glasnevin establishment no longer has a boarding school; the order's archives are stored and maintained here, and the order now has a nursing home, Marian House, on the Glasnevin campus.

The original foundation was St. Brigid's Orphanage, Dublin, where over 3000 orphans were accommodated and trained.

Activities
The order's ministry is in education, faith development and the promotion of justice. They set up and run a number of primary and secondary schools primarily in Dublin. Today the order works in Ireland, United States of America, Australia, New Zealand, Trinidad and South Sudan.

The Holy Faith sisters in collaboration with the Saint Patrick's Society for the Foreign Missions (Kiltegan Fathers), in 2013, worked to set up a primary school in Riwoto, South Sudan.

The St. Johns Education Centre is an initiative established in 1999 by the Holy Faith Sisters and De La Salle Brothers, to help students at risk of dropping out of the education system.

The Margaret Aylward Centre for Faith and Dialogue was built on the grounds of the Holy Faith Convent, in Glasnevin, in 2014 it held its inaugural lecture. The centre is used for conferences, meetings, retreats, lectures and courses.

Schools
The order's schools in Ireland are part of The Le Cheile Schools Trust:
 St. Michael's Holy Faith Finglas
 St David's Holy Faith 
 St. Brigids National School, Killester
 Holy Faith Secondary School, Clontarf
 St. Mary's Holy Faith Glasnevin (Secondary School)
 St. Mary's Holy Faith Killester (Secondary School)
 Margaret Aylward School (founded by order in 1969 transferred to Dublin VEC in 1983)
 Mother of Divine Grace, Primary School, Ballygall, Glasnevin, Dublin 11.
 St Wolstan’s Community School, Ballymakealy, Clane Road, Celbridge, Co. Kildare (with Archdiocese of Dublin and Kildare Kildare Wicklow ETB) 
 Tallaght Community School, Balrothery, Tallaght, Dublin 24 (with Marist Brothers and County Dublin DDLETB) 
 Holy Faith Convent of Trinidad and Tobago

Notes

References
 This entity cites:
Irish Directory (1909)

External links
Official Home Page

Catholic female orders and societies
Catholic teaching orders
Religious organizations established in 1857
Religious institutes in the Vincentian tradition